The Uruguyan Roller Hockey Championship is the biggest Roller Hockey Clubs Championship in Uruguay.

Participating teams in the last season
 Platense
 Pinamar
 Golden Wings de Maldonado
 CE.SO.PE (Centro Social Peñarol)
 Pioneros de Flores and Albatros de Montevideo

List of winners

Number of championships by team

External links

Uruguyan websites
Roller Hockey Uruguayan Federation 
Cesope Hockey Blog
Platense Patin Club
Roller Hockey in Pinamar
Roller Hockey in Maldonado
The Roller Hockey Magazine

International
 Roller Hockey links worldwide
 Mundook-World Roller Hockey
Hardballhock-World Roller Hockey
Inforoller World Roller Hockey
 World Roller Hockey Blog
rink-hockey-news - World Roller Hockey

Roller hockey in Uruguay
U
Uruguay